Bullfrog Valley is an unincorporated community in Illinois Township, Pope County, Arkansas, United States. It is located on Arkansas Highway 164 near the Johnson County line. The community is also located north of Silex.

References

Unincorporated communities in Pope County, Arkansas
Unincorporated communities in Arkansas